Sokna (also Sawknah, Sukna; native name: Tasuknit) is a presumably extinct Eastern Berber language which was spoken in the town of Sokna (Isuknan) and the village of Fuqaha in northeastern Fezzan in Libya. According to Václav Blažek (1999), Sokna was also spoken in the oasis of Tmassa.

The most extensive and recent materials on it are Sarnelli (1924) for Sokna and Paradisi (1963) for El-Fogaha. Both articles report that the language was spoken only by a handful of old people at the time, so it is generally presumed to be extinct.

Aikhenvald & Militarev (1984) and Blench (2006) consider Sokna and Fezzan to be separate languages. Blench lists Tmessa and Al-Foqaha as dialects of Fezzan.

References

Berber languages
Berbers in Libya
Languages of Libya